Gaki may refer to:

 The Japanese word for Preta
 A pen-name of Akutagawa Ryunosuke